The meridian 119° east of Greenwich is a line of longitude that extends from the North Pole across the Arctic Ocean, Asia, the Indian Ocean, Australasia, the Southern Ocean, and Antarctica to the South Pole.

The 119th meridian east forms a great circle with the 61st meridian west.

From Pole to Pole
Starting at the North Pole and heading south to the South Pole, the 119th meridian east passes through:

{| class="wikitable plainrowheaders"
! scope="col" width="130" | Co-ordinates
! scope="col" | Country, territory or sea
! scope="col" | Notes
|-
| style="background:#b0e0e6;" | 
! scope="row" style="background:#b0e0e6;" | Arctic Ocean
| style="background:#b0e0e6;" |
|-
| style="background:#b0e0e6;" | 
! scope="row" style="background:#b0e0e6;" | Laptev Sea
| style="background:#b0e0e6;" |
|-valign="top"
| 
! scope="row" | 
| Sakha Republic Irkutsk Oblast — from  Zabaykalsky Krai — from 
|-valign="top"
| 
! scope="row" | 
| Inner Mongolia
|-
| 
! scope="row" | 
|
|-valign="top"
| 
! scope="row" | 
| Inner Mongolia Hebei – from  Liaoning – from  Hebei – from 
|-
| style="background:#b0e0e6;" | 
! scope="row" style="background:#b0e0e6;" | Bohai Sea
| style="background:#b0e0e6;" |
|-valign="top"
| 
! scope="row" | 
| Shandong
|-
| style="background:#b0e0e6;" | 
! scope="row" style="background:#b0e0e6;" | Bohai Sea
| style="background:#b0e0e6;" | Laizhou Bay
|-valign="top"
| 
! scope="row" | 
| Shandong Jiangsu – from  Anhui – from  Jiangsu – from  Anhui – from  Zhejiang – from  Fujian – from 
|-
| style="background:#b0e0e6;" | 
! scope="row" style="background:#b0e0e6;" | South China Sea
| style="background:#b0e0e6;" |
|-
| 
! scope="row" | 
| Island of Palawan
|-
| style="background:#b0e0e6;" | 
! scope="row" style="background:#b0e0e6;" | Sulu Sea
| style="background:#b0e0e6;" |
|-
| 
! scope="row" | 
| Sabah – island of Borneo
|-valign="top"
| style="background:#b0e0e6;" | 
! scope="row" style="background:#b0e0e6;" | Celebes Sea
| style="background:#b0e0e6;" | Passing just east of Cape Mangkalihat, Borneo,  (at )
|-
| style="background:#b0e0e6;" | 
! scope="row" style="background:#b0e0e6;" | Makassar Strait
| style="background:#b0e0e6;" |
|-
| 
! scope="row" | 
| Island of Sulawesi
|-
| style="background:#b0e0e6;" | 
! scope="row" style="background:#b0e0e6;" | Makassar Strait
| style="background:#b0e0e6;" |
|-
| style="background:#b0e0e6;" | 
! scope="row" style="background:#b0e0e6;" | Java Sea
| style="background:#b0e0e6;" |
|-valign="top"
| style="background:#b0e0e6;" | 
! scope="row" style="background:#b0e0e6;" | Flores Sea
|-
| 
! scope="row" | 
| Island of Sumbawa
|-
| style="background:#b0e0e6;" | 
! scope="row" style="background:#b0e0e6;" | Sumba Strait
| style="background:#b0e0e6;" |
|-
| 
! scope="row" | 
| Island of Sumba
|-
| style="background:#b0e0e6;" | 
! scope="row" style="background:#b0e0e6;" | Indian Ocean
| style="background:#b0e0e6;" |
|-
| 
! scope="row" | 
| Western Australia
|-
| style="background:#b0e0e6;" | 
! scope="row" style="background:#b0e0e6;" | Indian Ocean
| style="background:#b0e0e6;" | Australian authorities consider this to be part of the Southern Ocean
|-
| style="background:#b0e0e6;" | 
! scope="row" style="background:#b0e0e6;" | Southern Ocean
| style="background:#b0e0e6;" |
|-
| 
! scope="row" | Antarctica
| Australian Antarctic Territory, claimed by 
|-
|}

See also
118th meridian east
120th meridian east

References

e119 meridian east